Pylyp Stepanovych Orlyk (October 11 (21), 1672 – May 26, 1742) was a Zaporozhian Cossack starshyna, Hetman in exile, diplomat, secretary and close associate of Hetman Ivan Mazepa. He is the author of the Constitution of Pylyp Orlyk.

Biography 

Pylyp Orlyk was born in the village of Kosuta, Ashmyany county, Grand Duchy of Lithuania (Vileyka district of modern-day Belarus), in a family of Czech-Belarusian origin.

Orlyk first studied at the Jesuit college in Vilnius and until 1694 at Kyiv Mohyla Academy. In 1698 he was appointed secretary of the consistory of Kiev metropolia. In 1699 he became a senior member of Hetman Ivan Mazepa's General Military Chancellery and 1706 was appointed general chancellor and at that position he was Mazepa's closest aide, facilitated Mazepa's secret correspondence with the Poles and Swedes, and assisted Mazepa in his efforts to form an anti-Russian coalition.

Hetman in exile

After the Battle of Poltava in 1709, he escaped together with Hetman Ivan Mazepa and king Charles XII of Sweden to Bender in the Principality of Moldavia, where Mazepa soon died. Pylyp Orlyk was then chosen as a Hetman in exile by the Cossacks and the Swedish king Charles XII. While in Bender Orlyk wrote one of the first state constitutions in Europe. This Constitution of Pylyp Orlyk was confirmed by Charles XII and it also names him as the protector of Ukraine.

Between 1711 and 1714, together with Crimean Tatars and small groups of Cossacks, Orlyk carried out unsuccessful raids into Right-bank Ukraine. Afterwards, Pylyp Orlyk now together with several other Cossacks followed the Swedish king Charles XII to Sweden via Vienna and Stralsund. Orlyk with his family and about 40 other Cossacks arrived in Ystad, Sweden in late November 1715. After some months in Ystad they lived in the city of Kristianstad for some years. Orlyk and his family left Stockholm in 1720 but as late as 1747 his widow and children received financial support from the Parliament of Sweden. From Sweden Orlyk first went to Hamburg, Hannover, Prague, Wrocław and Kraków, where he left his family to stay in a monastery. Orlyk went on to France and in 1722 he arrived in Iași in Ottoman Moldavia in order to organize an alliance against Russian Empire. From there he went on to Thessaloniki and from the mid-1730s he is known to have lived in Budjak. He died 1742 in Jassy, Principality of Moldavia (today Iași, Romania).

Orlyk wrote numerous proclamations and essays about Ukraine including the 1710 Constitution of Pylyp Orlyk.

In his history of Salonica Mark Mazower says

Memory 

In 2011 a monument dedicated to Pylyp Orlyk was erected in Kristianstad, Sweden on a building Ukrainian hetman lived in 1716–1719 years to celebrate tercentenary of Pylyp Orlyk's constitution. The authors of the monument are Boris Krylov and Oles Sydoruk.

104 streets and 22 alleys of Ukrainian settlements are named after Pylyp Orlyk. The streets of Vileik (Belarus) and Kristianstad (Sweden) are also named after the Hetman.

The National Bank of Ukraine issued two silver coins dedicated to Pylyp Orlyk (2002) and the first Ukrainian Constitution to Pylyp Orlyk (2010).

Ukrainian State Enterprise of Postal Service "Ukrposta" issued stamps in honor of Pylyp Orlyk (1997) and his Constitution (2010).

Ukrainian MPs and representatives of the Ukrainian diaspora in the U.S. established the Pylyp Orlyk International Prize in 2007, which is annually presented in Kiev to prominent Ukrainian and foreign lawyers. The award is currently presented by the International International Charitable Foundation for the People's Hero Mark Paslavsky.

The name of Hetman Pylyp Orlyk was given: Nikolaev International Classical University, Non-state think tank in Ukraine – Institute of Democracy in Kyiv and 43rd reservoir hut in Lviv.

Monuments and memorial signs to Hetman Pylyp Orlyk.

The monuments of the Hetman and memorial signs of the first Ukrainian Constitution were installed in Kosuta (Belarus) (2006), Baturyn (Ukraine) (2009), Bendery (Moldova) (2010), Kyiv (Ukraine) (2011), Orlyk in the Poltava region (Ukraine) (2011), Kristianstad (Sweden) (2011) and Ivano-Frankivsk (Ukraine) (2012).

In Baturyn, on the Maidan of Hetman glory, towering monument «Hetmans. Prayer for Ukraine», in the form of a sculptural group of five Ukrainian hetmans: Demian Ihnatovych, Ivan Samoylovych, Ivan Mazepa, Kyrylo Rozumovsky and Pylyp Orlyk. Hetman in emigration  Pylyp Orlyk stands beside his mentor Ivan Mazepa. The sculptural composition symbolizes the unity of their thoughts. Sculptures: Nikolai and Bogdan Mazura. Monument «Hetmans. Prayer for Ukraine» is solemnly opened on the Day of Cathedral of Ukraine, January 22, 2009. with the participation of the President of Ukraine Viktor Yushchenko.

Family 

Pylyp Orlyk married Hanna Hertsyk in the mid-1690s. She was of Jewish descent, a daughter of the colonel Pavlo Semenovych Hertsyk (a close ally of Mazepa) of the Poltava regiment. Pylyp and Hanna had eight children. They were:
 Anastasiya Orlyk (1699–1728) – born in Poltava. Married the Swedish nobleman and officer Johan Stenflycht (1681–1758) in 1723. They had two sons:
 Carl Gustaf (1724–1758) – colonel in the French regiment Royal Pologne.
 Filip (1726–1739) – died in Hamburg.
 Grégoire Orlyk (November 5, 1702 – † November 14, 1759) – born in Baturyn, Ukraine. His godfather was Hetman Ivan Mazepa. He studied at Lund University (1717–1718). After leaving Sweden in 1720 he first lived with his mother in Kraków, Poland. He later became a Lieutenant General in France where he called himself Comte d'Orlik. Although he kept the contact with Sweden and in 1742 he also visited Stockholm. In 1747 he married a French noblewoman, but they didn't have any children. He was killed in 1759 at the Battle of Minden in Germany where he also is buried.
 Mykhailo Orlyk (1704–?) – born in Baturyn, Ukraine. His godfather was Hetman Ivan Mazepa.
 Varvara Orlyk – born in Baturyn, Ukraine. Her godfather was Hetman Ivan Mazepa.
 Yakiv Orlyk (1711–?) – born in Bender, Ottoman Empire. His godfather was king Charles XII of Sweden.
 Marta Orlyk (1713–?) – born in Bender, Ottoman Empire. Her godfather was king Stanisław Leszczyński of Poland.
 Maryna Orlyk (1715–?) – born in Altefähr, Rügen, Swedish Pomerania. Her godparents were king Charles XII of Sweden's sister Ulrika Eleonora and king Stanisław Leszczyński of Poland.
 Kateryna Orlyk (November 5, 1718–?) – born in Kristianstad, Skåne, Sweden and probably died already in 1719.

See also
 Constitution of Pylyp Orlyk
 List of Ukrainian rulers

References

  Jean-Benoit Scherer,  Annales de la Petite-Russie, ou Histoire des Cosaques-Saporogues et des Cosaques de l'Ukraine (Adamant Media Corporation,  2001)

External links
 Minsk honors Ukrainian hetman, born in Belarus 
 Taras Chuhlib, The Belarusian roots of hetman Pylyp Orlyk, Zerkalo Nedeli (Mirror Weekly), October 28 – November 3, 2006, in Russian and in Ukrainian.

1672 births
1742 deaths
People from Vileyka District
People from Vilnius Voivodeship
Pylyp
Hetmans of the Zaporozhian Cossacks
Ukrainian people of Belarusian descent
Ukrainian people of Czech descent
National University of Kyiv-Mohyla Academy alumni
Vilnius University alumni
17th-century Ukrainian people
18th-century Ukrainian people
People of the Great Northern War
Orlyk, Pylyp